Solène is a French name, now usually given to girls but in the past given to boys too:

Solène (bishop), bishop of Chartres and saint
Solène of Aquitaine, 3rd century Christian martyred at Chartres, France
Solène Rigot (1992) French actress
Solène Ndama (1998) French athlete competing in the 100 metres hurdles, heptathlon and pentathlon
Solène Durand (1994) French football goalkeeper
Solène Jambaqué (1988) French alpine skier and two time Paralympic Champion.
Solène Coulot (1989-2010) French curler

French feminine given names